Spree-Neiße is a Kreis (district) in the southern part of Brandenburg, Germany. Neighboring districts are (from the south clockwise) the districts Niederschlesischer Oberlausitzkreis and Kamenz in Saxony, the districts Oberspreewald-Lausitz, Dahme-Spreewald and Oder-Spree. The district-free city Cottbus is surrounded by the district. To the east is Poland.

Geography 
The district is located in the region of Lusatia. The Spree river runs through the district, while the Lusatian Neisse river forms the eastern border, which is at the same time the border of Poland.

History 
The district was created in 1993 by merging the previous districts Cottbus-Land, Forst, Guben and Spremberg.

Coat of arms 

The coat of arms shows four fields each representing one of the previous districts. The crayfish in the topleft symbolizes Cottbus-Land, and is also present in the coat of arms of the city of Cottbus. The lion in the topright is the symbol of the Kingdom of Bohemia, as Spremberg was owned by the Bohemian kings. The deer antler in the bottomright symbolizes Forst, and was taken from the coat of arms of the Lords of Biberstein. The crown in the bottomleft represents the kings of Bohemia again, but this time symbolizing Guben.

Towns and municipalities

Demography

References

External links 

 Official website of the Landkreis Spree-Neiße